Christopher Wallace (born November 4, 1975) is an American football quarterback for the Atlanta Havoc of the American Arena League (AAL). He played as a quarterback for the University of Toledo. He was signed as an undrafted free agent by the Orlando Predators in 2001.

Early life
Wallace attended South High School in Springfield, Ohio.

College career
Wallace attended the University of Toledo after his graduation from high school. At the time of his graduation, Wallace was the only Rocket to have thrown five touchdowns in a game, achieving the feat twice. His 27 touchdowns in 1997 were a school record for a single season until they were broken by Bruce Gradkowski in 2003. He currently sits at sixth all time in Toledo history for passing yards in a career.

Statistics
Through end of the 1998 season, Wallace' college statistics were as follows:

Professional career

Since commencing his professional career, Wallace has played for a number of indoor football teams. On March 24, 2002, Wallace was placed on injured reserve by the Orlando Predators. He spent eight seasons with the Florida Firecats of the af2 and was that league's all-time leader in passing yardage.  In 2011, he was briefly the starting quarterback of the Arena Football League's New Orleans Voodoo, starting two games and winning one; later in the same season he started for the Pittsburgh Power.  He joined the Tarpons in 2012 and completed 157 passes on 272 attempts for 2,091 yards and 63 touchdowns, leading the team to a conference title and Ultimate Bowl II. In 2013, Wallace lead the Tarpons to an Ultimate Bowl III victory over the Corpus Christi Fury. In March, 2014, Wallace came back to playing football when he signed with the Marion Blue Racers. Wallace returned to the Tarpons in 2015.

Coaching career
In June, 2013, Wallace was named the first head coach of the expansion Columbus Beast of the Xtreme Indoor Football League, but when the Beast owner moved his other franchise (the Marion Blue Racers) to the Continental Indoor Football League, it was announced that Wallace was to be the Head Coach for the Blue Racers. However, Wallace left the Blue Racers to pursue his teaching career.

References

1975 births
Living people
American football quarterbacks
Toledo Rockets football players
Players of American football from Ohio
Carolina Rhinos players
Orlando Predators players
Tennessee Valley Vipers players
Florida Firecats players
New Orleans VooDoo players
Pittsburgh Power players
Florida Tarpons players
Marion Blue Racers players
American Arena League players